Jack Austin (born 15 October 1945) is  a former Australian rules footballer who played with St Kilda and Fitzroy in the Victorian Football League (VFL).

Notes

External links 
		

Living people
1945 births
Australian rules footballers from Victoria (Australia)
St Kilda Football Club players
Fitzroy Football Club players